General elections are scheduled to be held in Pakistan less than 60 days after the dissolution of the National Assembly, which is set to dissolve on 13 August 2023 upon completing its five year term, unless dissolved earlier, in which case the election shall be held within 90 days after dissolution according to the constitution. This means that the election must be held no later than 14 October 2023.  The three major parties are Pakistan Tehreek-e-Insaf (PTI) led by Imran Khan, Pakistan Muslim League (N) (PML-N) led by incumbent prime minister Shehbaz Sharif and Pakistan Peoples Party (PPP) led by incumbent Foreign Minister Bilawal Bhutto Zardari.

Background

2018 elections

General elections were held in Pakistan on Wednesday 25 July 2018 after the completion of a five-year term by the outgoing government. At the national level, elections were held in 272 constituencies, each electing one member to the National Assembly. At the provincial level, elections were held in each of the four provinces to elect Members of the Provincial Assemblies (MPA).

As a result of the elections, the Pakistan Tehreek-e-Insaf (PTI) became the single largest party at the national level both in terms of both popular vote and seats. At the provincial level, the PTI remained the largest party in Khyber Pakhtunkhwa (KP); the Pakistan Peoples Party (PPP) remained the largest party in Sindh and the newly-formed Balochistan Awami Party (BAP) became the largest party in Balochistan. In Punjab, a hung parliament prevailed with Pakistan Muslim League (N) (PML-N) emerging as the largest party in terms of directly elected seats by a narrow margin. However, following the joining of many independent MPAs into the PTI, the latter became the largest party and was able to form the government.

Opinion polling prior to campaigning had initially shown leads for the Pakistan Muslim League (N) (PML-N) over the PTI. However, from an 11-point lead, the PML-N's lead began to diminish in the final weeks of the campaign, with some polls close to the election showing PTI with a marginal but increasing lead. In the final result, the PTI made a net gain with 31.82% of the vote (its highest share of the vote since its foundation), while the PML-N made a net loss with 24.35%. In the lead-up to the elections, there had been allegations by some pre-poll rigging being conducted by the judiciary, the military and the intelligence agencies to sway the election results in favour of the PTI and against the PML-N. The opposition to the winning parliamentary party alleged large-scale vote rigging and administrative malpractices. However, Reuters polling suggested PML-N's lead had narrowed in the run-up to the elections, and that the party had suffered "blow after blow" which caused setbacks to any hopes of re-election. Some  had termed the ruling PML-N "embattled... facing a number of desertion and corruption charges". Imran Khan proceeded to form the coalition government, announcing his cabinet soon after. The newly formed coalition government included members of the Muttahida Qaumi Movement and Pakistan Muslim League (Q).

Regarding the voting process, the Election Commission of Pakistan (ECP) outrightly rejected reports of rigging and stated that the elections were conducted fair and free. A top electoral watchdog, Free and Fair Election Network (FAFEN), also said that the 2018 general elections in Pakistan had been "more transparent in some aspects" than the previous polls. In its preliminary report, the European Union Election Observation Mission said that no rigging had been observed during the election day in general, but found a "lack of equality" and criticized the process more than it had in the Pakistani election of 2013.

Electoral system
The 336 members of the National Assembly consist of 266 general seats elected by first-past-the-post voting in single-member constituencies, 60 seats reserved for women elected by proportional representation based on the number of general seats won by each party in each province, and ten seats reserved for non-Muslims elected through proportional representation based on the number of overall general seats won by each party.

The government had passed a bill that required the next general elections to be held using EVMs (electronic voting machines). This was aimed at bringing an end to the allegations of rigging that have plagued previous elections in Pakistan, but the opposition's opinion was that it would make it extremely easy for PTI to rig the elections in their favour through security loopholes.
In 2022 when the PTI-led government was ousted through a successful vote of no-confidence in the National Assembly, the 11 opposition parties, some of them being long-time rivals, formed a new government and passed the Elections Amendment Bill, which nullified the use of EVMs in the next general elections. Hence, EVMs will not be used in next general elections.

Parties
The table below lists each party that either received a share of the vote higher than 0.5% in the 2018 Pakistan general election or had representation in the 15th National Assembly of Pakistan. Political parties are ordered by their vote share in the 2018 elections. Independent Candidates bagged 11.46% of the vote and 13 national assembly seats (both general seats and total seats in the 15th National Assembly, as reserved seats for women and minorities, are given to political parties) in 2018.

Opinion polls 

In the run up to the 2023 Pakistani general elections, various organisations have been carrying out opinion polling to gauge voting intention throughout Pakistan and the approval rating of the civilian Pakistani government, led by Imran Khan's Pakistan Tehreek-e-Insaf. The results of such polls are displayed in this section. The date range for these opinion polls are from the previous general election, held on 25 July 2018, to the present day.

National Assembly Voting intention

The results in the tables below (excluding the column on undecided voters and non-voters) exclude survey participants who said they wouldn't vote or they didn't know who they would vote for and add up to 100%. In polls that include undecided voters or non-voters, percentages are adjusted upwards in order to make the total equal 100%. Margins of error are also adjusted upwards at the same rate to account for the increase.

Nationwide

Punjab

Sindh

Khyber Pakhtunkhwa

Government approval rating

The results in this table show polls that surveyed whether people approved or disapproved of either the overall (not on a single issue) performance of the federal government in Islamabad or the Prime Minister’s overall performance since 18 August 2018. 

The same rounding restrictions that were given in the previous section do not apply here, so occasionally, results will add up to 101% or 99% due to rounding errors, and neutral respondents (when data is available for them) are counted in this table, unlike the last table.

See also
2023 Punjab provincial election
2023 Khyber Pakhtunkhwa provincial election

Notes

References

2023
Pakistan
Pakistan
General
Future elections in Pakistan